The 2020 Tour de la Provence was a road cycling stage race that took place between 13 and 16 February 2020 in the French region of Provence. The race is rated as a 2.Pro event as part of the 2020 UCI Europe Tour and the 2020 UCI ProSeries, and was the fifth edition of the Tour de la Provence cycling race.

Teams
Twenty-one teams were invited to the race. Of these teams, fourteen are UCI WorldTour teams, five are UCI Professional Continental teams, and two are UCI Continental teams. Of the starting peloton of 145 riders, only 126 riders finished.

UCI WorldTeams

 
 
 
 
 
 
 
 
 
 
 
 
 
 

UCI Professional Continental Teams

 
 
 
 
 

UCI Continental Teams

Route

Stages

Stage 1
13 February 2020 – Châteaurenard to Saintes-Maries-de-la-Mer,

Stage 2
14 February 2020 – Aubagne to La Ciotat,

Stage 3
15 February 2020 – Istres to Mont Ventoux–Chalet Reynard,

Stage 4
16 February 2020 – Avignon to Aix-en-Provence,

Classification leadership table

Classification standings

General classification

Points classification

Mountains classification

Young rider classification

Teams classification

References

Sources

External links
 

2020
Tour de la Provence
Tour de la Provence
Tour de la Provence
Tour de la Provence